The Government Protection Bureau or Bureau of Government Protection was Poland's equivalent of the  United States Secret Service, providing antiterrorism and VIP security services for the Polish government. On February 1, 2018, the bureau was disbanded and a new State Protection Service was formed in its place, absorbing its manpower and functions (security of incumbent and former Presidents of Poland, high ranking state officials, institutions and Polish embassies and consulates abroad).

Subjects of protection

 President of the Republic of Poland
 Prime Minister of the Republic of Poland
 Marshal of the Sejm
 Marshal of the Senate
 Deputy Prime Ministers
 Minister of Foreign Affairs
 Minister of Interior and Administration 
 Former Presidents (for life while on Polish soil)
 Former Prime Ministers (for a six-month period after leaving office)
 Other individuals by decree of the Minister of Interior
 Foreign heads of state, governments, representatives and diplomats while on Polish soil

References

External links 
 Official web page of the Government Protection Bureau (in Polish)
 Web page of the Government Protection Bureau (in English)

National security institutions
Government agencies of Poland
Government agencies established in 1956
1956 establishments in Poland